Ville is a commune in the Oise department in the region of Hauts-de-France in northern France. The village is divided into a northern part and a southern part by the river Divette.

Demographics
The population of the town is relatively young. The rate of persons above the age of 60 years (16.8%) is lower than the national rate (21.6%) and the department rate (17.5%). Unlike national and departmental allocations, the male population of the town is greater than the female population (51.8% against 48.4% nationally and 49.3% at the departmental level).

The distribution of the population of the municipality by age groups is, in 2007, as follows:
51.8% of men (0–14 years = 25.2%, 15–29 years = 14.1%, 30–44 years = 25.9%, 45–59 years = 18.9%, more than 60 years = 15.9%);
48.2% of women (0–14 years = 19.7%, 15–29 years = 15.7%, 30–44 years = 27.3%, 45–59 years = 19.5%, more than 60 years = 17.9%).

The château
The first castle stood at a place later known as Le Vieux Château (The Old Castle) near the junction of Rue du Château and Rue de l'Archerie. By the early 19th century the castle was in ruins and in 1840 it was replaced by a new château comprising a main building and two symmetrical wings situated just to the north east of the village church. This building was partially destroyed during the First World War and rebuilt on the old plans in the late 1920s.

See also
Communes of the Oise department

References

Communes of Oise